The 2015–16 Hong Kong League Cup is the 13th edition of the Hong Kong League Cup. The Cup is contested by the 9 teams in the 2015–16 Hong Kong Premier League. Kitchee won their 5th title on 9 April 2016.

Calendar

Results

Group stage

Group A

Group B

Semi-finals

Final

External links
 Hong Kong League Cup - Hong Kong Football Association

2015–16 domestic association football cups
Lea
2015-16